The 2017 Swedish Golf Tour was the 32nd season of the Swedish Golf Tour, a series of professional golf tournaments for women held in Sweden and Norway.

A number of the tournaments also featured on the 2017 LET Access Series (LETAS).

Schedule
The season consisted of 9 tournaments played between May and October, where one event was held in Norway.

See also
2017 Swedish Golf Tour (men's tour)

References

External links
Official homepage of the Swedish Golf Tour

Swedish Golf Tour (women)
Swedish Golf Tour (women)